Jean Case (previously Villanueva and Wackes, born 1959) is an American businesswoman, author, and philanthropist who is chair of the board of National Geographic, CEO of Case Impact Network, and CEO of the Case Foundation. She is married to AOL co-founder Steve Case.

Early life 
Case was born in Bloomington, Illinois and raised in Normal, Illinois before moving to Florida. She attended high school at the Westminster Academy in Fort Lauderdale, graduating in 1978.

Career

Early career 
Case began her career as the marketing manager with online information services Source Telecomputing Corporation (The Source) and joining a General Electric “team trying to drive disruptive innovation within a big company” at General Electric Information Services (GEnie). Case then joined America Online (AOL) when it was a small startup and was at the table as it grew into the company that provided Internet services to about half of all U.S. homes with Internet access, worked as director of marketing, vice president for marketing, and vice president for corporate communications. She left AOL in 1996.

She and her husband created the Case Foundation in 1997 and they joined the Giving Pledge in 2011, committing to give away a majority of their wealth.

In June 2006, Case was appointed by President George W. Bush to chair the President's Council on Service and Civic Participation.

In 2007, Case was asked by U.S. Secretary of State Condoleezza Rice to serve as a co-chair of the U.S.-Palestinian Partnership to promote economic opportunities for the Palestinian people, prepare Palestinian youth for the responsibilities of citizenship and good governance, and marshal new private investment in the West Bank.

In 2016, Case gave a TedxMidAtlantic talk, where she highlighted the importance innovators have played in the history of the United States and examined modern entrepreneurship.

In 2018, in reference to the under-representation of woman-founded and African-American-founded companies as recipients of venture capital, Case stated, "One thing we know for sure is talent is evenly distributed. Opportunity is not."

In 2021, she advocated for making it easier for inexperienced investors to make stock market bets.

Board membership
In February 2016, Case was elected chair of the National Geographic Society's board of trustees, the first woman to hold the position, and also serves on the boards of Accelerate Brain Cancer Cure, the White House Historical Association, and BrainScope Company, Inc., as well as the advisory councils of the Stanford Center on Philanthropy and the Civil Society, Georgetown University's Beeck Center for Social Impact & Innovation, and the Brain Trust Accelerator Fund. Past board and advisory council leadership includes the Harvard Business School Social Enterprise Initiative, the President's Council on Service and Civic Participation, and Malaria No More.

Investments
Case has long been a "leader in impact investing" and was a cofounder of The ImPact, a membership network of family enterprises (family offices, foundations, and businesses) that are committed to making investments with measurable social impact and was a member of the U.S. NAB to the G7 Task Force on Impact Investing.

Case has been profiled for her impact investments by The New York Times, Financial Times, and Bloomberg News. Jean and Steve Case have personally invested in and leveraged new online platforms for social good, such as Network for Good, Causes, and MissionFish. In 2011, she opened Early Mountain Vineyards, a 300-acre property in Madison, Virginia, whose wines have won awards from Wine Enthusiast and USA Today. In 2018, Washington Post wine columnist Dave McIntyre wrote "Early Mountain is a Virginia winery riding a rocket."

Awards and recognition
Jean and Steve Case were named by Barron's as one of the "25 Best Givers" in 2011 and one of the "9 Most Generous Tech Entrepreneurs" by Fast Company in 2013. They received the Woodrow Wilson Award for Corporate Citizenship in 2001. The award was given out by the Woodrow Wilson International Center for Scholars of the Smithsonian Institution in Washington, D.C. Jean and Steve Case were honored with the Lifetime of Idealism Award by City Year in 2009 and honored as Citizens of the Year by the National Conference on Citizenship in 2011

Case was named the Washington Business Journals Corporate Philanthropist of the Year in 2011. In 2013 she received the Excellence in Entrepreneurship Award from Wake Forest University and was a finalist for the Washington Business Journals "Most Admired Nonprofit CEO." That same year she as a mentor for the Wall Street Journals "Startup of the Year."

In 2014, Case received an honorary Doctor of Humane Letters degree from Indiana University Lilly Family School of Philanthropy for her philanthropic work, and in 2015 she received an honorary Doctor of Humane Letters from George Mason University.

In 2016, Case was elected to the American Academy of Arts and Sciences.

In 2020, the National Venture Capital Association (NVCA) presented Case, and her husband Steve, with the 2020 American Spirit Award recognizing their philanthropic leadership and outstanding contribution to society.

Personal life 
While Case was working at AOL, she divorced her first husband and started a relationship with Steve Case. She and Steve married in 1998 in a ceremony officiated by the Rev. Billy Graham. They previously resided in McLean, Virginia, in a mansion that was the childhood home of Jacqueline Bouvier, which they sold in 2018.

Publications
 Case, Jean; Be Fearless: 5 Principles for a Life of Breakthroughs and Purpose

References

External links

 The Case Foundation
 Jean and Steve Case on their strategy for changing the world
 It’s Time To Be Fearless, Stanford Social Innovation Review 
 How to Build the Perfect Philanthropy, Time magazine, Oct. 10, 2012
 
 White House Hosts Innovation Forum for Philanthropists, Chronicle of Philanthropy
 Steve and Jean Case on discuss philanthropy with NYSE CEO Duncan Niederauer
 What Happens When You Infuse Philanthropy With Tech Entrepreneurial Spirit?
 Video of Jean Case opening the Promoting Innovation Summit, co-hosted by the Case Foundation, the White House Office of Science & Technology Policy and the Domestic Policy Council, April 30, 2010
 Malaria No More
 U.S.-Palestinian Partnership
 "How the New Philanthropy Works" -- Time op-ed by President Bill Clinton, First Lady Laura Bush, and Case Foundation CEO Jean Case, Sept. 24, 2006
  at the 2007 Global Philanthropy Forum, July 5, 2007
 Video of U.S. Secretary of State Condoleezza Rice, U.S.-Palestinian Partnership (UPP) Chairman Walter Isaacson, and UPP Co-Chairs Ziad Asali and Jean Case—at a meeting and joint press availability with U.S. business leaders and UPP, April 29, 2008
 Video of Jean Case moderating a panel on "Partners in Service: The Role of the Private Sector" at the 2008 ServiceNation Summit, Sept. 12, 2008
 Video of Jean Case's TedXMidAtlantic Talk on the Importance of Entrepreneurship and Innovators
 Jean Case on Unlocking the American Dream

1959 births
Living people
American women chief executives
American nonprofit chief executives
AOL people
People from McLean, Virginia
American women philanthropists
National Geographic Society
People from Bloomington, Illinois
People from Normal, Illinois
21st-century American women